Fyodor Alexandrovich Vasilyev (1850 – 1873) was a Russian Imperial landscape painter who introduced the lyrical landscape style in Russian art.

Biography

Fyodor Vasilyev was born in Gatchina to a low-level government official, Alexander Vasilyevich Vasilyev, and Olga Emelyanova Polyntseva on 22 February N.S. 1850. His parents married four years later, so he was always considered an illegitimate child.  Feodor had to earn his living from the age of 12 – he worked as a mailman, scribe, and assistant to a restorer of pictures. After his father’s death, he became the sole supporter of the family.

In 1863, he managed to enter the evening classes of the School of Painting at the Society for Promotion of Artists. While at school, Vasilyev got acquainted with many painters, who took care of him.

In 1866 famous landscape painter Ivan Shishkin fell in love with Feodor's sister Evgenia Vassilyev. Shishkin became acquainted with Feodor and started to teach him landscape painting. From July to November 1867 Shishkin and Vassilyev worked together on island of Valaam. Some places on Valaam were subjects of both artist's paintings. Later Shishkin introduced Feodor to Ivan Kramskoi, Ilya Repin, and art collectors Pavel Mikhailovich Tretyakov and Pavel Sergeyevich Stroganov. Later Vasilyev became a major competitor to Ivan Shishkin and the latter was often accused of using intrigues and administrative influence trying to win over Vasilyev on different art competitions.

In Vasilyev’s early works, such as After a Thunderstorm (1868), Near a Watering Place (1868) and others, one can feel the influence of the Barbizon school; it affected his art but never resulted in a non-creative borrowing of the motifs. Though, at first, Vasilyev was somewhat inferior technically to the Barbizon painters, most critics agree that he eventually found his own way of handling the subject.  After a Rain (1869) and After a Rain. Country Road exceed in many respects the Barbizon stormy scenes in their expressiveness and deeply national sound.

In 1870, Vasilyev traveled on the Volga with Ilya Repin, the picture Volga View. Barges(1870) was a great success. In 1870 he became a member of Peredvizhniki movement (one of the original twenty members).

In 1871, Vasilyev painted Thaw (1871), which made him famous immediately. The tzar family's (Prince Alexander, future Alexander III of Russia), ordered a copy, and the Society for Promotion of Artists awarded him first prize. Later Prince Alexander's copy was exponated on the 1872 London World Fair and won a medal. Vasilyev was admitted, as an intern, to the Imperial Academy of Arts (which, among other things, gave him an exception from conscription to the Army).

The "boy genius", as he was called in the artistic circles of Russia, had no time to enjoy his popularity – he was diagnosed with tuberculosis and had to leave St. Petersburg forever. He moved to Crimea. The Society for Promotion of Artists sponsored his stay there, but he was obliged to pay with his paintings.

Vasilyev could not get used to the new scenery. He went on to paint the Russian plains; his works, such as his masterpiece Wet Meadow (1872), were done from memory, old sketches and his imagination. After some time Vasilyev started to draw Crimea, gradually beginning to feel the attraction to its mountain views. Mountains of Crimea (1873) was an outstanding work and the last work of the artist.

He died in Yalta on 6 October N.S. 1873 at the age of 23. His posthumous exhibition in Saint Petersburg was a great success, and all his works were sold prior to the exhibition. His works had a strong influence on the next generation of Russian landscape painters. Nikolai Ge said, He discovered for us the Sky. Many art historians emphasize Fedor Vasilyev's influence on Isaac Levitan, Valentin Serov, Viktor Borisov-Musatov.

Works

In philately
 In 1975, the USSR Post issued in honor of Vasiliev a series of six stamps and a block.

See also
 List of Russian artists

References
 Rodionov, V. (2007). Masterpieces of the State Tretyakov Gallery, Moscow: Red Square Publishers.

External links

Online Vasilyev Gallery - in English
Biography - in Russian
Chronology of Vasilyev's life  - in Russian

1850 births
1873 deaths
People from Gatchina
People from Tsarskoselsky Uyezd
19th-century painters from the Russian Empire
Russian male painters
Realist painters
Russian landscape painters
19th-century male artists from the Russian Empire